Holon Children's Museum is a children's museum in Holon, Israel.

History
Special exhibits include "Dialogue in The Dark" led by a sight-impaired guide, and "Invitation To Silence," an inter-active exhibition exploring communication led by deaf guides.

References

 

Museums in Tel Aviv District
Children's museums
Holon
Museums established in 2001
2001 establishments in Israel
Child-related organizations in Israel